Viyusa Makhaphela (born 20 December 1986) is a South African cricketer. He played in 43 first-class, 12 List A, and 6 Twenty20 matches from 2006 to 2015.

References

External links
 

1986 births
Living people
South African cricketers
Border cricketers
Warriors cricketers